Chul fair is held on Dhuleti (the second day of Holi) at Gangardi of Garbada taluka and Raniyar village of Zhalod taluka. Tribals of Panchmahal, Bharuch and Vadodara districts also enjoy Chul fair on Dhuleti day.

Time
The Chul fair is held in the month of March.

Significance
People from different places gather at the Chul fair till noon. The specialty of this fair is that it is prepared by digging a big pit one foot wide and five to six feet long. Then in this pit large pieces (coals) of acacia wood etc. are burnt and embers are made.

According to News Plus Gujarati, 'The Chul fair is not just about entertainment and refreshment, religious beliefs also associated with the Chul fair.'

On this occasion all the tribal people walk barefoot on embers seven times from one end to the other with a coconut and a jug of water in their hands. Then the coconut sacrificeby bowing to Agnidev.

Remembering their deity with faith, the tribesmen walk barefoot over the burning embers, though their feet do not burn at all. And people keep Votive of Agnidev for the protection of their children and animals.

Some men and young boys rub turmeric on their bodies. Applies collyrium on eyes and even black dots on the cheeks. Women also come to the fair with their babies in short sleeved yellow or green blouse and red Odhni (dupatta or chunni). Men, women and children dance to the beat of drums with swords and sticks in their hands. People in their respective groups enjoy eating, drinking and singing at this chul fair.

Adequate police provision is maintained at Chul fair(Mela) by the police department as part of vigilance.

References

Festivals in Gujarat